Jamaibabu Jindabad is a 2001 Bengali film directed by Ratan Adhikari and produced by Surinder Singh under the banner of Surinder Film. The film features actors Prosenjit Chatterjee and Rituparna Sengupta in the lead roles. Music of the film has been composed by Babul Bose. The movie is a remake of 1986 Kannada hit movie Anuraga Aralithu.

Cast 
 Prosenjit Chatterjee as Sagar Mukherjee, Chief Mechanic at Chowdhury Industries
 Rituparna Sengupta as Kajol Chowdhury, Owner of Chowdhury Industries
 Deepankar Dey as Shubhomoy Chowdhury, Kajol's father
 Laboni Sarkar as Sagar's mother
 Shankar Chakraborty
 Subhendu Chatterjee
 Biplab Chatterjee as Mr. Ghosh
 Anuradha Ray as Kajol's mother
 Kaushik Banerjee as M.K. Dutta, Manager at Chowdhury Industries 
 Ramaprasad Banik
 Saheli Mukhopadhyay as Priya, Receptionist at Chowdhury Industries

Soundtrack

References 

Bengali-language Indian films
2001 films
2000s Bengali-language films
Bengali remakes of Kannada films